Richard Bourke (1777–1855) was an Irish-born British Army officer.

The name may also refer to:
 Ricard Bourke, 9th Mac William Iochtar (died 1509), Irish chieftain and noble 
 Ricard Ó Cuairsge Bourke, 7th Mac William Iochtar (died1473), Irish chieftain and noble 
 Ricard mac Seaán an Tearmainn Bourke, 16th Mac William Iochtar (died 1571), Irish chieftain and noble 
Richard Southwell Bourke, 6th Earl of Mayo (1822–1872), Irish statesman
Richard Bourke (born 1965), Irish academic
Richard Bourke (1767–1832), Irish bishop
Richard Brooks (captain) (1765—1833) English settler in colonial New South Wales
Richard the Iron Bourke, 18th Mac William Iochtar (died 1583), Irish chieftain and noble
Richard Bourke, 19th Mac William Iochtar (died 1586), Irish chieftain and noble
Richard "the Devils Hook" Bourke, 22nd Mac William Iochtar (died 1601), Irish chieftain and noble
 Rick Bourke (1953–2006), Australian rugby league footballer